Chayei Sarah, Chaye Sarah, Hayye Sarah, or Hayyei Sara (—Hebrew for "life of Sarah," the first words in the parashah), is the fifth weekly Torah portion (parashah) in the annual Jewish cycle of Torah reading. It constitutes . The parashah tells the stories of Abraham's negotiations to purchase a burial place for his wife Sarah and his servant's mission to find a wife for Abraham's son Isaac.

The parashah is made up of 5,314 Hebrew letters, 1,402 Hebrew words, 105 verses, and 171 lines in a Torah Scroll (Sefer Torah). Jews read it on the fifth Sabbath after Simchat Torah, generally in November, or on rare occasion in late October.

Readings
In the Masoretic Text of the Tanakh (Hebrew Bible), Parashat Chayei Sarah has three "open portion" (petuchah) divisions (roughly equivalent to paragraphs, often abbreviated with the Hebrew letter  (peh)). Parashat Chayei Sarah has one "closed portion" (setumah) division (abbreviated with the Hebrew letter  (samekh)) within the "open portion" division of the second reading. The long first open portion spans the first five readings. The second open portion coincides with the sixth reading. And the third open portion coincides with the seventh reading.

First reading—Genesis 23:1–16
In the first reading, Sarah lived 127 years and died in Hebron, and Abraham mourned for her. Abraham asked the Hittites to sell him a burial site, and the Hittites invited him to bury his dead in the choicest of their burial places. Abraham asked the Hittites to intercede for him with Ephron son of Zohar to sell Abraham the cave of Machpelah at full price. Before the Hittites at the town gate, Ephron offered to give Abraham the field and the cave that was in it, but Abraham insisted on paying the price of the land. Ephron named the value of the land at 400 shekels of silver and Abraham accepted Ephron's terms, gave him the silver, and purchased the land. The first reading  ends here.

Second reading—Genesis 23:17–24:9
In the second reading, Abraham thus established his title to the land through purchase, and he buried Sarah in the cave. Abraham was old, and instructed his senior servant to put his hand under Abraham's thigh and swear by God that he would not take a wife for Isaac from the Canaanites, but would go to the land of Abraham's birth to get Isaac a wife. The servant asked if the woman did not consent to follow him to Canaan, should he take Isaac back to the land from which Abraham came? Abraham told him on no account to take Isaac back there, for God—who took Abraham from there and promised Abraham the land of Canaan for his offspring—would send an angel before the servant and allow him successfully to get a wife for Isaac from there, and if the woman did not consent to follow him, he would then be clear of his oath. So the servant put his hand under Abraham's thigh and swore to him as Abraham had asked. The second reading ends here.

Third reading—Genesis 24:10–26
In the third reading, the servant took Abraham's bounty and ten of Abraham's camels and traveled to Aram-Naharaim, the city of Nahor. He made the camels kneel by the well outside the city at evening, when women come out to draw water. The servant asked God to grant that the maiden whom he would ask to draw water for him and who replied by offering also to water his camels might be the one whom God had decreed for Isaac. He had scarcely finished speaking when Rebekah, the beautiful virgin daughter of Abraham's nephew Bethuel, came out with her jar on her shoulder, went down to the spring, filled her jar, and came up. The servant ran toward her and asked to sip a little water from her jar, and she quickly let him drink and when he had drunk his fill, she offered to draw water for his camels until they finished drinking. When the camels had finished drinking, the servant took a gold nose-ring and two gold bands for her arms, and asked her whose daughter she was and whether there was room in her father's house for him to spend the night. She identified herself and told him that there was plenty of straw and feed and room at her home for him to spend the night. The servant bowed low to God. The third reading ends here.

Fourth reading—Genesis 24:27–52
In the fourth reading, the servant blessed God for steadfast faithfulness to Abraham. Rebekah ran and told everything to her mother's household. Rebekah's brother Laban ran out to the servant at the spring, and when he saw the nose-ring and the bands on Rebekah's arms, and when he heard his sister tell the story, Laban invited the servant to their house, had the camels unloaded and fed, and had water brought to bathe the feet of the servant and his party. But the servant would not eat before he had told his tale. The servant told how God had greatly blessed Abraham with sheep and cattle, silver and gold, male and female slaves, camels and asses, and a son and sole heir. The servant told how Abraham made him swear to go to Abraham's kindred to get Isaac a wife, and that God would send an angel to make his errand successful. And the servant told how he met Rebekah at the well. The servant then asked whether or not they meant to treat Abraham with true kindness, and Laban and Bethuel answered that the matter had been decreed by God and Rebekah could go and be Isaac's wife. The servant bowed low to God. The fourth reading ends here.

Fifth reading—Genesis 24:53–67
In the fifth reading, the servant brought out silver, gold, and garments for Rebekah and presents for her brother and her mother. Then the servant and his party ate, drank, and spent the night. The next morning, the servant asked leave to return to Abraham, but Laban and her mother asked that Rebekah remain a period of time. The servant persisted, so they called Rebekah to ask her, and she agreed to go. So they blessed Rebekah—wishing that her children be thousands of myriads and seize the gates of their foes—and they sent off Rebekah and her nurse with the servant. Isaac had just come back from the vicinity of Beer-lahai-roi to his home in the Negeb and was out walking in the field toward evening when he looked up and saw camels approaching. Raising her eyes, Rebekah saw Isaac, alighted from the camel, and asked the servant who the man was. The servant said that Isaac was his master, so she covered herself with her veil. The servant told Isaac everything that had happened, and Isaac brought her into Sarah's tent and took her as his wife. Isaac loved Rebekah, and found comfort after his mother's death. The fifth reading and the long first open portion end here with the end of chapter .

Sixth reading—Genesis 25:1–11
In the sixth reading, in chapter , Abraham took another wife, named Keturah, who bore him Zimran, Jokshan, Medan, Midian, Ishbak, and Shuah. Abraham willed all that he owned to Isaac, but to his sons by concubines he gave gifts while he was still living, and he sent them away from his son Isaac to the land of the East. Abraham lived 175 years and died old and contented. Isaac and Ishmael buried him in the cave of Machpelah with Sarah. After Abraham's death, God blessed Isaac and he settled near Beer-lahai-roi. The sixth reading and the second open portion end here.

Seventh reading—Genesis 25:12–18
In the seventh reading, Ishmael had 12 sons, who became chieftains of 12 tribes. In the maftir reading that concludes the parashah, Ishmael lived 137 years and then died. Ishmael's progeny dwelt in lands all the way from Havilah, near Egypt, to Asshur. The seventh reading, the third open portion, and the parashah end here.

Readings according to the triennial cycle
Jews who read the Torah according to the triennial cycle of Torah reading read the parashah according to the following schedule:

In inner-Biblical interpretation
The parashah has parallels or is discussed in these Biblical sources:

Genesis chapter 23
Similarly,  reports that Arba was the father of Anak, and  tells that Arba was the father of the Anokites.

The cave of Machpelah in which  reports Abraham buried Sarah later became the burial site for Abraham himself (as reported in ) and thereafter Isaac, Rebekah, Leah, and Jacob (as reported in ).

Genesis chapter 24
Isaac Abrabanel and other commentators noted a number of differences between the two recountings.

Each involves (1) a trip to a distant land, (2) a stop at a well, (3) a young woman coming to the well to draw water, (4) a heroic drawing of water, (5) the young woman going home to report to her family, (6) the visiting man brought to the family, and (7) a subsequent marriage.

In early nonrabbinic interpretation
The parashah has parallels or is discussed in these early nonrabbinic sources:

Genesis chapter 23
The second century BCE Book of Jubilees reported that Abraham endured ten trials and was found faithful and patient in spirit. Jubilees listed eight of the trials: (1) leaving his country, (2) the famine, (3) the wealth of kings, (4) his wife taken from him, (5) circumcision, (6) Hagar and Ishmael driven away, (7) the binding of Isaac, and (8) buying the land to bury Sarah.

Genesis chapter 24
Josephus reported that Rebekah told Abraham's servant, "my father was Bethuel, but he is dead; and Laban is my brother; and, together with my mother, takes care of all our family affairs, and is the guardian of my virginity."

In classical rabbinic interpretation
The parashah is discussed in these rabbinic sources from the era of the Mishnah and the Talmud:

Genesis chapter 23
A Midrash noted that  recorded that "the life of Sarah was a hundred and seven and twenty years" rather than "one-hundred-twenty-seven years," and deduced that as the righteous are whole and unblemished by sin, so are their years reported whole in the Bible. Thus the Midrash taught that at the age of 20, Sarah was as at the age of 7 in beauty, and at the age of 100, she was as at the age of 20 in sin (the age below which Providence does not punish for sin).

Rabbi Haggai said in Rabbi Isaac's name that all of the Matriarchs were prophets.

Rabbi Abba bar Kahana interpreted the words, "The sun rises, and the sun sets," in Ecclesiastes  to teach that before God causes the sun of one righteous person to set, God causes the sun of another righteous person to rise. Thus a Midrash taught that before God allowed Sarah's sun to set, God caused Rebekah's sun to rise. Thus  first says, "Behold, Milcah, she also has borne children . . . and Bethuel begot Rebekah," and after that,  says, "and the lifetime of Sarah was a hundred years . . . ."

Once while lecturing, Rabbi Akiva asked why Esther deserved to reign over 127 provinces (as indicated by ). Rabbi Akiva taught that the reason was this: Let Esther, the descendant of Sarah, who lived 127 years (as  reports), come and reign over 127 provinces.

Noting that  reports that "Sarah died in Kiriat-arba," literally, "city of four," a Midrash taught that the city had four names—Eshcol, Mamre, Kiriat-arba, and Hebron. Midrash taught that it was called Kiriat-arba because four righteous men dwelt there—Aner, Eshcol, Mamre, and Abraham; four righteous men were circumcised there—Abraham, Aner, Eshcol, and Mamre; four righteous men were buried there—Adam, Abraham, Isaac, and Jacob; and four matriarchs were buried there—Eve, Sarah, Rebekah, and Leah.

A Midrash deduced from the words "Abraham came to mourn for Sarah, and to weep for her" in  that Abraham came directly from Mount Moriah and the binding of Isaac. The Midrash told that at the very moment in  that the angel of the Lord stayed Abraham from sacrificing Isaac, the Satan appeared to Sarah in the guise of Isaac. When Sarah saw him, she asked what Abraham had done to him. He told Sarah that Abraham had taken him to a mountain, built an altar, placed wood upon it, tied him down on it, and took a knife to slaughter him, and had God not told him not to lay a hand on him, Abraham would have slaughtered him. As soon as he finished speaking, Sarah's soul departed. Similarly, reading , "And Abraham came to mourn for Sarah," the Pirke De-Rabbi Eliezer reported that Abraham came from Mount Moriah to find that Sarah had died. When Abraham set out from Mount Moriah in peace, the anger of Sammael (the Satan) was kindled, for he saw that his desire to frustrate Abraham's offering had not been realized. So Sammael told Sarah that Abraham had killed Isaac and offered him as a burnt offering upon the altar. Sarah began to weep and to cry aloud three times, corresponding to the three sustained notes (of the shofar), and she gave forth three howlings corresponding to the three disconnected short notes (of the shofar), and her soul fled, and she died.

The Gemara further taught that Sarah would have been pleased that Abraham delayed her funeral so that he could eulogize her.

Rav Ashi deduced from  that as long as a person has the obligation to bury a body, it is as if the corpse lay before the person.  says: "And Abraham rose up from before his dead," indicating that he departed from the presence of Sarah's body. And then  says: "that I may bury my dead out of my sight," showing that Abraham still spoke as if Sarah's corpse were lying before him. (And this status affects a person's obligation to perform other commandments.) Similarly, Rabbi Johanan taught that we learn from the words, "And Abraham rose up from before his dead and spoke," in  that one whose dead lies before him is exempt from reciting the Shema (as the verse implies that until Sarah's burial, Abraham did nothing but make arrangements for it).

And the Lord said to Satan: ‘From where do you come?' Then Satan answered. . . ." The Gemara taught that Satan then told God: "Sovereign of the Universe, I have traversed the whole world and found none so faithful as Your servant Abraham. For You said to him, ‘Arise, walk through the land in the length of it and in the breadth of it; for to you will I give it,' and even so, when he was unable to find any place in which to bury Sarah until he bought one for 400 shekels of silver, he did not complain against Your ways." For there is none like him in the earth . . . ."

They told Abraham that he was king over them and a god to them. But Abraham replied that the world did not lack its King, and the world did not lack its God.

He attained priesthood, as  says, "The Lord has sworn, and will not repent: 'You are a priest forever after the manner of Melchizedek." And he attained kingship, as  says, "You are a mighty prince among us."

One held that the cave consisted of two chambers one within the other, and the other held that it consisted of a lower and upper chamber. According to one, the term "double cave" meant that it was the burial place of multiple couples—Adam and Eve, Abraham and Sarah, Isaac and Rebekah, and Jacob and Leah.

Similarly, Rabbi Jehudah taught that the three Patriarchs Abraham, Isaac, and Jacob made covenants with the people of the Land of Israel. In Abraham's case, this is how it happened: When the three angels visited him (as reported in ), Abraham ran to meet them and prepare for them a great banquet. He told Sarah to prepare cakes for them, but when Sarah was kneading, she perceived that the manner of women was upon her, so Abraham did not serve his visitors any of the cakes. Rather, Abraham ran to fetch a calf, but the calf fled from him and went into the cave of Machpelah. Abraham chased in after the calf, and found Adam and Eve lying there upon their beds. Lights were kindled above them, and a sweet scent was upon them. Abraham consequently sought to get the cave as a burial possession. He spoke to the sons of Jebus to purchase the cave from them. The men did not accept his request at first. He began to bow down and prostrate himself to them, as  reports, "And Abraham bowed himself down before the people of the land." They told Abraham that they knew that in the future God would give all the land to Abraham and his descendants. Thus, they asked Abraham to make a covenant with them that Abraham's descendants would not take possession of the cities of the Jebusites, and they would sell him the cave of Machpelah as a perpetual possession. So Abraham made a covenant with them with an oath that the Israelites would not take possession of the city of the Jebusites (Jerusalem) without the consent of the Jebusites and then bought the cave of Machpelah as a perpetual possession, as  reports, "And Abraham hearkened to Ephron; and Abraham weighed to Ephron the silver, which he had named in the hearing of the children of Heth, four hundred shekels of silver, current money with the merchant." The Jebusites made images of copper inscribed with Abraham's covenant, and set them up in the streets of the city. When David reigned, he wanted to enter the city of the Jebusites, but they did not allow him, as  reports, "And the king and his men went to Jerusalem against the Jebusites, the inhabitants of the land; who spoke to David, saying, ‘You shall not come in here.'" Although the Israelites were numerous, they were unable to capture the city because of the force of the sign of Abraham's covenant. David saw this and turned back, as  reports, "And David dwelt in the stronghold" (not in the city). David's men told him that he would not be able to enter the city until he had removed all those images upon which Abraham's covenant was written. So David told his men that whoever would remove those images would be the chief. Joab the son of Zeruiah did so and became the chief, as  reports, "And Joab the son of Zeruiah went up first, and was made chief." Thereafter, David bought the city of the Jebusites for Israel with a deed for a perpetual possession, as  reports, "So David gave to Ornan for the place six hundred shekels of gold by weight."

The Gemara deduced from the use of the term "take" in  that "taking" means by monetary exchange.

Contrasting the behavior of Abraham and Epron, Rabbi Eleazar taught that the righteous promise little and perform much; whereas the wicked promise much and do not perform even little. The Gemara deduced the behavior of the wicked from Ephron, who in  said, "The land is worth 400 shekels of silver," but  reports, "And Abraham hearkened to Ephron; and Abraham weighed to Ephron the silver, which he had named in the audience of the sons of Heth, 400 shekels of silver, current money with the merchant," indicating that Ephron refused to accept anything but centenaria (which are more valuable than ordinary shekels). And the Gemara deduced the behavior of the righteous from Abraham, who in  offered, "And I will fetch a morsel of bread," but  reports, "And Abraham ran to the herd," doing much more than he offered.

Rabbi Judan the son of Rabbi Simon cited Abraham's purchase of the cave at Machpelah as one of three places where Scripture reports purchases in the Land of Israel, thus providing a defense against the nations of the world who might taunt the Jews, saying that the Israelites had stolen the Land. The three instances are: the cave of Machpelah, of which  reports, "And Abraham weighed to Ephron the silver"; Joseph's Tomb, of which  reports, "And he bought the parcel of ground"; and the Temple, of which  reports, "So David gave to Ornan for the place six hundred shekels of gold."

The Mishnah attributed to Abraham a good eye (a magnanimous spirit in financial matters, based, for example, on Abraham's generous and ungrudging nature in his dealings with Ephron the Hittite in ).

Rabbi Haninah taught that every time the Torah refers to silver coin (shekel kesef) without any qualification, it means a sela (shekel), except for the silver coin that  cites in the transaction with Ephron. For although  mentions the coinage without qualification, it means centenaria (worth 100 shekels each), because  says: "400 shekels of silver current money with the merchant" (implying that wherever there were merchants, these shekels had to be accepted as such), and there is a place where they call centenaria "shekels."

Rav Judah said in the name of Rav that , which says, "So the field of Efron which was in Machpelah . . . and all the trees that were in the field that were in the border thereof," indicates that Abraham in buying the field acquired all the small trees that were identified by their surrounding boundary. But the purchase did not include those large, distinctive trees that did not require a surrounding boundary for people to know to whom they belonged. And Rav Mesharsheya deduced from  that one who buys a field also gains title to the border strips and the trees on these strips surrounding the field.

Genesis chapter 24
The Mishnah and Tosefta deduced from  that God blessed Abraham in his old age because (as the Mishnah deduced from ) he kept the entire Torah even before it was revealed.

Rabbi Hama ben Hanina taught that our ancestors were never without a scholars' council. Abraham was an elder and a member of the scholars' council, as  says, "And Abraham was an elder (zaken) well stricken in age." Eliezer, Abraham's servant, was an elder and a member of the scholars' council, as  says, "And Abraham said to his servant, the elder of his house, who ruled over all he had," which Rabbi Eleazar explained to mean that he ruled over—and thus knew and had control of—the Torah of his master. Isaac was an elder and a member of the scholars' council, as  says: "And it came to pass when Isaac was an elder (zaken)." Jacob was an elder and a member of the scholars' council, as  says, "Now the eyes of Israel were dim with age (zoken)." In Egypt they had the scholars' council, as  says, "Go and gather the elders of Israel together."

Of Isaac,  says, "And I have eaten from everything." And of Jacob,  says, "Because I have everything." Already in their lifetimes they merited everything, that is perfection. The Gemara read these three verses also to teach that Abraham, Isaac, and Jacob were three people over whom the evil inclination had no sway, as Scripture says about them, respectively, "with everything," "from everything," and "everything," and the completeness of their blessings meant that they did not have to contend with their evil inclinations. And the Gemara read these same three verses to teach that Abraham, Isaac, and Jacob were three of six people over whom the Angel of Death had no sway in their demise—Abraham, Isaac, Jacob, Moses, Aaron, and Miriam. As Abraham, Isaac, and Jacob were blessed with everything, the Gemara reasoned, they were certainly spared the anguish of the Angel of Death.

The Pirke De-Rabbi Eliezer told that when Abraham left Ur of the Chaldees, all the magnates of the kingdom gave him gifts, and Nimrod gave Abraham Nimrod's first-born son Eliezer as a perpetual slave. After Eliezer had dealt kindly with Isaac, he set Eliezer free, and God gave Eliezer his reward in this world by raising him up to become a king—Og, king of Bashan.

Ravina explained that this accorded with the view of Rabbi Haninah bar Idi, who said that Jewish judicial proceedings require swearing by the Name of God. Rav Ashi replied that one might even say that it accorded with the view of the Rabbis, who said that a witness can be adjured with a Substitute for the Name of God. They concluded that the witness needs to hold something sacred in his hand, as Abraham's servant did when in  he put his hand under Abraham's thigh and held Abraham's circumcision. Rava said that a judge who adjures by "the Lord God of heaven" without having the witness hold a sacred object errs and has to repeat the swearing correctly. Rav Papa said that a judge who adjures with tefillin errs and has to repeat the swearing. The law follows Rava, but not Rav Papa, as tefillin are considered sacred.

Rabbi Haggai observed in Rabbi Isaac's name that Abraham prophesied in  when he said, “He will send His angel before you.” Rabbi Haggai taught in Rabbi Isaac's name that even though Abraham was capable of prophesy, he still needed God's kindness, as  reports Abraham's servant praying, “And show kindness to my master Abraham.” Rabbi Haggai concluded in Rabbi Isaac's name that all need God's kindness.

The Midrash explained that Abraham's camels were distinguishable wherever they went, because they were led out muzzled so as not to graze in other people's fields.

Reading the report of  that Abraham's servant had "all the goods of his master's in his hand," Rabbi Helbo explained that this was a deed of gift (made by Abraham of all his wealth to Isaac, so that a bride would be more eager to marry him). Similarly, Rabbi Simeon (or some say Rabbi Shemajah) taught that Abraham wrote a will that bequeathed all that he had as an inheritance to Isaac, as  says, "And Abraham gave all that he had to Isaac." Abraham took the document and gave to Eliezer, his servant, who reasoned that since the document was in his hand, all Abraham's money was in his hand, so that he might go and be recommended thereby in Abraham's father's house and with his family.

The servant was astonished that he had arrived on the same day, and said (as reported in ), "And I came this day to the fountain." Rabbi Abbahu taught that God wished to show loving-kindness to Isaac, and he sent an angel before Eliezer to shorten the way for him, so that the servant came to Haran in three hours. The Midrash thus counted Abraham's servant along with Jacob and Abishai the son of Zeruiah as men who miraculously traveled long distances in a short time when the earth trembled, closing gaps and thereby speeding them along. The Rabbis thus taught that the earth shrank to speed Eliezer's journey, as it would again for Jacob (as implied in ) and Abishai the son of Zeruiah.

The Midrash explained that he thus followed the usual practice: Whoever seeks a neighbor sits at the water and find the neighbor there, as everyone eventually comes to the water. The Midrash noted that all the righteous who left their homes went to wells.

Rav Huna taught that there was just as little reason in the servant's plan, "At the time of evening, the time that women go out to draw water."

The Midrash explained that the servant knew that if she answered that way, she would be a righteous woman, eager to show hospitality, just like Abraham and Sarah.

Rabbi Samuel bar Nahmani said in the name of Rabbi Jonathan that Abraham's servant Eliezer made an improper request when in  he asked God to grant that the young woman whom he would ask to draw water for him and who replied by offering also to water his camels might be the one whom God had decreed for Isaac. Rabbi Samuel asked what would have happened if she had happened to be lame or blind, and concluded that Eliezer was fortunate that Providence answered him by sending Rebekah to meet him. Rabbi Samuel compared Eliezer's request to the improvident oaths that Saul made in 1 Samuel  when he promised his daughter to the man who would kill Goliath and that Jephthah made in  when he promised to sacrifice whatever came out of his house to meet him on his return. Similarly, a Midrash taught that Abraham's servant was one of four who asked improperly—Eliezer, Caleb, Saul, and Jepthah. The Midrash asked: What if a slave woman had done as Eliezer had asked? Yet the Midrash taught that God prepared Rebekah for him and granted his request in a fitting manner.

Rabbi Simeon bar Yohai taught that God answered three men even while their petition was still on their lips: Abraham's servant Eliezer, Moses, and Solomon. With regard to Eliezer,  reports: "And it came to pass, before he had done speaking, that, behold, Rebekah came out." With regard to Moses,  reports: "And it came to pass, as he made an end of speaking all these words, that the ground did cleave asunder." And with regard to Solomon, 2 Chronicles  reports: "Now when Solomon had made an end of praying, the fire came down from heaven."

The Pirke De-Rabbi Eliezer taught that God saw that everything miraculously came together for Abraham's servant. A daughter of kings, Rebekah, who in all her life had never gone forth to draw water, went out to draw water at that hour. And the girl, who did not know who Abraham's servant was, accepted his proposal to be married to Isaac. The Pirke De-Rabbi Eliezer taught that this happened because she had been destined for him from birth.

Rav Nahman bar Isaac cited a Tanna that interpreted  to teach that Rebekah was virgin between the ages of 12 and 12½ (a naarah) when Abraham's servant encountered her.

Rabbi Isaac called Bethuel a wicked man. A Midrash identified Bethuel as a king.

Rava asked Rabba bar Mari from where people derived the saying: If you are aware of a derogatory matter about yourself, say it first before others say it about you.

They reasoned that one could judge a lion from its welp and concluded that they could not overcome him. Thereupon, they removed the poisoned food that they had given Abraham's servant.

Rabbi Joshua the son of Rabbi Nehemiah in the name of Rabbi Haninah ben Isaac said that the decree with regard to Rebekah that Laban and Bethuel acknowledged came from Mount Moriah.

Noting that  reports that the next day, Rebekah's "brother and her mother said, ‘Let the maiden remain with us some ten days,'" the Rabbis asked where Bethuel was. The Midrash concluded that Bethuel wished to hinder Rebekah's marriage, and so he was smitten during the night. The Rabbis said that Abraham's servant did not disclose Bethuel's fate to Isaac.

The Gemara reasoned that if , yamim, in  means "days" and thus to imply "two days" (as the plural implies more than one), then  would report Rebekah's brother and mother suggesting first two days, and then when Eliezer said that that was too long, nonsensically suggesting ten days. The Gemara thus deduced that , yamim, must mean "a year," as  implies when it says, "if a man sells a house in a walled city, then he may redeem it within a whole year after it is sold; for a full year (yamim) shall he have the right of redemption." Thus  might mean, "Let the maiden abide with us a year, or at the least ten months." The Gemara then suggested that , yamim, might mean "a month," as  suggests when it uses the phrase "a month of days (yamim)." The Gemara concluded, however, that , yamim, means "a month" only when the term "month" is specifically mentioned, but otherwise means either "days" (at least two) or "a year." Similarly, the Mishnah taught that they allowed a virgin 12 months to prepare for her wedding after her fiancé told her to prepare.

The Midrash deduced from this that a fatherless maiden may not be given in marriage without her consent.

In , Rebekah's brother and mother "called Rebekah, and said to her: ‘Will you go?'" Rabbi Uanina, the son of Rav Adda, said in Rabbi Isaac's name that Rebekah's brother and mother hinted to Rebekah (putting the question in a tone of surprise), "Will you (really) go?" "And she said: ‘I will go.'" Rebekah did not simply say "yes," but replied that she would go, in spite of her brother and mother, whether they wished it or not.

The Pirke De-Rabbi Eliezer taught that Laban and his family ate and drank at a bridal banquet for Rebekah. And then, like an officiant who stands and blesses a bride in her bridal canopy, they stood and blessed Rebekah their sister on her upcoming wedding to Isaac, as  reports, "And they blessed Rebekah, and said to her, ‘Our sister . . . .'"

The Pirke De-Rabbi Eliezer taught that the servant left Haran at noon and took Rebekah and her nurse Deborah riding on the camels. So that the servant would not be alone with the maiden Rebekah by night, the earth once again contracted before them, and in three hours, they came to Hebron at the time of the afternoon prayer (that is, at 3 p.m.).

Thus, interpreting , Rav Huna taught that when Rebekah first saw Isaac, she saw his hand stretched out in prayer.

 
Rabbi José taught that Isaac observed three years of mourning for his mother. After three years he married Rebekah, and forgot the mourning for his mother. Hence Rabbi José taught that until a man marries a wife, his love centers on his parents. When he marries a wife, he bestows his love upon his wife, as  says, "Therefore shall a man leave his father and his mother, and he shall cleave unto his wife."

A Midrash taught that as long as Sarah lived, a cloud (signifying the Divine Presence) hung over her tent. When she died, the cloud disappeared. But when Rebekah came, it returned. As long as Sarah lived, her doors were wide open. At her death that liberality ceased. But when Rebekah came, that openhandedness returned. As long as Sarah lived, there was a blessing on her dough, and the lamp used to burn from the evening of the Sabbath until the evening of the following Sabbath. When she died, these ceased. But when Rebekah came, they returned. And so when Isaac saw Rebekah following in his mother Sarah's footsteps, separating her challah in cleanness and handling her dough in cleanness (rereading the words of ), "Isaac brought her into the tent, (and, behold, she was like) his mother Sarah."

Rabbi Judan read  to teach a rule of propriety: If a man has grown-up sons (and both the man and his sons wish to marry), he must first see that his sons marry and then take a wife himself. Rabbi Judan derived this from Abraham's example, for first  says, "And Isaac brought her into his mother Sarah's tent," and after that,  says, "And Abraham took another wife, and her name was Keturah."

Genesis chapter 25
Rabbi Judah said that Keturah was another name for Hagar.

Rabbi Judah said that Abraham gave Isaac the birthright. The Rabbis said that Abraham gave the privilege of being buried in the cave of Machpelah and a deed of gift. Rabbi Judah the son of Rabbi Simon, Rabbi Berekiah, and Rabbi Levi in the name of Rabbi Hama the son of Rabbi Hanina taught that Abraham did not bless Isaac, but gave him gifts. Rabbi Hama likened this to a king who had an orchard, which he entrusted to a steward. The orchard contained two trees that were intertwined, and one of which yielded life-giving fruit and the other a deadly poison. The steward thought that if he watered the life-bearing tree, the death-bearing one would flourish with it; while if he did not water the death-bearing tree, the life-bearing could not survive. On reflection, the steward decided that his position required him to do his duty, and whatever the owner of the orchard wished to do, he could do. In like manner, Abraham argued that if he blessed Isaac, the children of Ishmael and of Keturah would also be blessed; while if he did not bless the children of Ishmael and Keturah, he could not bless Isaac. On reflection, he decided that he was only flesh; he would do his duty, and whatever God wished to do, God would do. Consequently, when Abraham died, God appeared to Isaac and blessed him, as  reports, "And it came to pass after the death of Abraham, that God blessed Isaac his son."

A Midrash told that the Ishmaelites came before Alexander the Great to dispute the birthright with Israel, accompanied by the Canaanites and the Egyptians. Gebiah the son of Kosem representing the Jews, asked Alexander whether a man could not do as he wished to his sons. When Alexander replied that a man could, Gebiah quoted , "And Abraham gave all that he had to Isaac." The Ishmaelites asked where the deed of gift to his other sons was. Gebiah replied by quoting , "But to the sons of the concubines, whom Abraham had, Abraham gave gifts." Thereupon the Ishmaelites departed in shame.

Rabbi Hama son of Rabbi Haninah taught that  shows God comforting the mourning Isaac, and thus demonstrates one of God's attributes that humans should emulate. Rabbi Hama son of Rabbi Haninah asked what  means in the text, "You shall walk after the Lord your God." How can a human being walk after God, when  says, "[T]he Lord your God is a devouring fire"? Rabbi Hama son of Rabbi Haninah explained that the command to walk after God means to walk after the attributes of God. As God clothes the naked—for  says, "And the Lord God made for Adam and for his wife coats of skin, and clothed them"—so should we also clothe the naked. God comforted mourners—for  says, "And it came to pass after the death of Abraham, that God blessed Isaac his son"—so should we also comfort mourners. God buried the dead—for  says, "And He buried him in the valley"—so should we also bury the dead. Similarly, the Sifre on  taught that to walk in God's ways means to be (in the words of ) "merciful and gracious."

In medieval Jewish interpretation
The parashah is discussed in these medieval Jewish sources:

Genesis chapter 24

The Zohar taught that when Abraham's servant reached Haran and met Rebekah (in the words of ) "at the time of evening," it was the time of the afternoon (mincha) prayer. Thus the moment when Isaac began the afternoon prayer coincided with the moment when Abraham's servant encountered Rebekah. So, too, Rebekah came to Isaac (as reported in ) at the very moment of Isaac's afternoon prayer.

Reading , Obadiah ben Jacob Sforno distinguished what Abraham's servant did from divination. According to Sforno, Abraham's servant did not make what he said a sign whereby he might recognize Isaac's destined wife, because that would be divination; rather he prayed that it might occur the way that he described. If an individual says something not as a prayer, but in the nature of, "If such-and-such happens, then I shall do this," then the individual is guilty of divination.

Genesis chapter 25
Rashbam identified the "concubines" to whom  refers as Hagar and Keturah.

The Zohar, however, deduced from the plural of "concubines" in  that Abraham had two concubines beside Sarah and Hagar and thus like Jacob had four spouses.

In modern interpretation
The parashah is discussed in these modern sources:

Genesis chapter 23
Professor John Van Seters of the University of North Carolina argued that the Abraham cycle was a postexilic invention of the 5th century CE or later.

Genesis chapter 24
 discusses a gold ring of half a shekel or a bekah in weight and gold bracelets of ten shekels in weight. This table translates units of weight used in the Bible into their modern equivalents:

Commandments

According to Maimonides and Sefer ha-Chinuch, there are no commandments in the parashah.

In the liturgy
The parashah is reflected in these parts of the Jewish liturgy:

The Sages deduced from Isaac's "meditation . . . toward evening" in  that Isaac began the practice of the afternoon (mincha) prayer service.

The Weekly Maqam
In the Weekly Maqam, Sephardi Jews each week base the songs of the services on the content of that week's parashah. For Parashat Chayei Sarah, Sephardi Jews apply Maqam Hijaz, the maqam that expresses mourning and sadness, because the parashah contains the deaths of both Sarah and Abraham.

Tomb of Sarah 

The tomb of Sarah is located in the Cave of Machpelah in Hebron along with that of Abraham and the other Biblical Matriarchs and Patriarchs. Every year on the Shabbat in which Parashat Chayei Sarah is read in synagogue services, thousands of people visit the site. Known as Shabbat Hebron, the weekend can attract more than 35,000 people.

Haftarah
A haftarah is a text selected from the books of Nevi'im ("The Prophets") that is read publicly in the synagogue after the reading of the Torah on Sabbath and holiday mornings. The haftarah usually has a thematic link to the Torah reading that precedes it. 

The specific text read following Parashah Chayei Sarah varies according to different traditions within Judaism. Examples are: 

for Ashkenazi Jews, Sephardi Jews, and Dardai communities: :
for Yemenite Jews: 
for Karaite Jews: 
for Italian Jews:

Notes

Further reading
The parashah has parallels or is discussed in these sources:

Biblical
 (courtship at the well).
 (courtship at the well).

Early nonrabbinic
Apocalypse of Abraham. Circa 70–150 CE. Translated by R. Rubinkiewicz. In The Old Testament Pseudepigrapha: Volume 1: Apocalyptic Literature and Testaments. Edited by James H. Charlesworth, pages 681–705. New York: Anchor Bible, 1983.
Testament of Abraham. Circa 1st or 2nd century CE. Translated by E. P. Sanders. In The Old Testament Pseudepigrapha: Volume 1: Apocalyptic Literature and Testaments. Edited by James H. Charlesworth, pages 871–902. New York: Anchor Bible, 1983.

Classical rabbinic
Mishnah: Ketubot 5:2; Kiddushin 4:14; Avot 5:19. Land of Israel, circa 200 C.E. In, e.g., The Mishnah: A New Translation. Translated by Jacob Neusner, pages 387–88, 498, 688–89. New Haven: Yale University Press, 1988.
Tosefta: Sotah 7:3, 10:5; Kiddushin 5:17. Land of Israel, circa 300 C.E. In, e.g., The Tosefta: Translated from the Hebrew, with a New Introduction. Translated by Jacob Neusner, pages 861, 876, 946. Peabody, Massachusetts: Hendrickson Publishers, 2002.
Jerusalem Talmud: Berakhot 43a; Orlah 9b; Shabbat 45b; Rosh Hashanah 12a; Ketubot 5a; Sotah 32a; Kiddushin 1a, 11b, 16b; Sanhedrin 62a. Tiberias, Land of Israel, circa 400 CE. In, e.g., Talmud Yerushalmi. Edited by Chaim Malinowitz, Yisroel Simcha Schorr, and Mordechai Marcus, volumes 1, 12, 14, 24, 31, 37, 40, 45. Brooklyn: Mesorah Publications, 2005–2018. And in, e.g., The Jerusalem Talmud: A Translation and Commentary. Edited by Jacob Neusner and translated by Jacob Neusner, Tzvee Zahavy, B. Barry Levy, and Edward Goldman. Peabody, Massachusetts: Hendrickson Publishers, 2009.
Genesis Rabbah 8:13; 38:10; 42:5; 45:9; 48:16; 55:6; 58:1–62:5; 65:9; 66:4; 67:9; 68:2–4, 9; 70:12; 79:7; 85:7; 96; 97. Land of Israel, 5th Century. In, e.g., Midrash Rabbah: Genesis. Translated by Harry Freedman and Maurice Simon, volume 1, page 63, 309, 347, 357, 386–87, 416, 485–86; volume 2, pages 509–55, 584, 594, 603, 613, 616–18, 621, 645, 732, 794, 931–32. London: Soncino Press, 1939.
Leviticus Rabbah 19:5; 20:11; 30:10; 37:4. Land of Israel, 5th Century. In, e.g., Midrash Rabbah: Leviticus. Translated by Harry Freedman and Maurice Simon. London: Soncino Press, 1939.
Esther Rabbah 2:9. 5th–11th centuries. In, e.g., Midrash Rabbah: Esther. Translated by Maurice Simon, volume 9, page 40. London: Soncino Press, 1939.

Babylonian Talmud: Berakhot 18a, 26b, 61a; Shabbat 62b, 77a; Eruvin 18b, 53a; Pesachim 3a; Yoma 28b; Taanit 4a; Megillah 17a; Moed Katan 18b; Yevamot 61b, 64a; Ketubot 57a–b; Nedarim 41b; Sotah 5a, 14a; Gittin 76a; Kiddushin 2a, 4b, 82a; Bava Kamma 92b; Bava Metzia 87a; Bava Batra 15b, 16b, 69b, 141a; Sanhedrin 46b, 59b, 91a, 95a, 107b; Shevuot 38b; Avodah Zarah 7b; Zevachim 62b; Chullin 95b, 120a; Bekhorot 50a. Sasanian Empire, 6th Century. In, e.g., Talmud Bavli. Edited by Yisroel Simcha Schorr, Chaim Malinowitz, and Mordechai Marcus, 72 volumes. Brooklyn: Mesorah Pubs., 2006.
Song of Songs Rabbah 2:41; 3:8. 6th–7th centuries. In, e.g., Midrash Rabbah: Song of Songs. Translated by Maurice Simon, volume 9, pages 133, 153. London: Soncino Press, 1939.
Ruth Rabbah 4:3; 7:12. 6th–7th centuries. In, e.g., Midrash Rabbah: Ruth. Translated by L. Rabinowitz, volume 8, pages 51, 88. London: Soncino Press, 1939.
Ecclesiastes Rabbah 2:30. 6th–8th centuries. In, e.g., Midrash Rabbah: Esther. Translated by Maurice Simon, volume 8, pages 17, 72, 124, 174, 232. London: Soncino Press, 1939.

Medieval
Deuteronomy Rabbah 2:11; 9:4; 11:1. Land of Israel, 9th Century. In, e.g., Midrash Rabbah: Deuteronomy. Translated by Harry Freedman and Maurice Simon. London: Soncino Press, 1939.

Exodus Rabbah 1:32; 31:17; 32:9. 10th Century. In, e.g., Midrash Rabbah: Exodus. Translated by S. M. Lehrman. London: Soncino Press, 1939.
Lamentations Rabbah 1:19. 10th century. In, e.g., Midrash Rabbah: Deuteronomy/Lamentations. Translated by A. Cohen, volume 7, pages 46, 85. London: Soncino Press, 1939.
Solomon ibn Gabirol. A Crown for the King, 16:199–200; 22:269–70. Spain, 11th Century. Translated by David R. Slavitt, pages 28–29, 36–37. New York: Oxford University Press, 1998.

Rashi. Commentary. Genesis 23–25. Troyes, France, late 11th Century. In, e.g., Rashi. The Torah: With Rashi's Commentary Translated, Annotated, and Elucidated. Translated and annotated by Yisrael Isser Zvi Herczeg, volume 1, pages 241–70. Brooklyn: Mesorah Publications, 1995.
Rashbam. Commentary on the Torah. Troyes, France, early 12th century. In, e.g., Rabbi Samuel Ben Meir's Commentary on Genesis: An Annotated Translation. Translated by Martin I. Lockshin, pages 101–30. Lewiston, New York: The Edwin Mellen Press, 1989.
Abraham ibn Ezra. Commentary on the Torah. Mid-12th century. In, e.g., Ibn Ezra's Commentary on the Pentateuch: Genesis (Bereshit). Translated and annotated by H. Norman Strickman and Arthur M. Silver, pages 228–47. New York: Menorah Publishing Company, 1988.

Numbers Rabbah 2:1, 26; 10:5; 14:10–11; 15:12; 19:32; 21:20. 12th Century. In, e.g., Midrash Rabbah: Numbers. Translated by Judah J. Slotki. London: Soncino Press, 1939.
Maimonides. The Guide for the Perplexed, part 1, chapters 12, 19, 37, 41; part 2, chapters 19, 30, 48. Cairo, Egypt, 1190. In, e.g., Moses Maimonides. The Guide for the Perplexed. Translated by Michael Friedländer, pages 24, 28, 53, 56, 188, 218, 250. New York: Dover Publications, 1956.
Hezekiah ben Manoah. Hizkuni. France, circa 1240. In, e.g., Chizkiyahu ben Manoach. Chizkuni: Torah Commentary. Translated and annotated by Eliyahu Munk, volume 1, pages 166–86. Jerusalem: Ktav Publishers, 2013.

Nachmanides. Commentary on the Torah. Jerusalem, circa 1270. In, e.g., Ramban (Nachmanides): Commentary on the Torah: Genesis. Translated by Charles B. Chavel, volume 1, pages 281–312. New York: Shilo Publishing House, 1971.
Midrash ha-Ne'lam (The Midrash of the Concealed). Spain, 13th century. In, e.g., Zohar, part 1, pages 121a–30a. Mantua, 1558–1560. In, e.g., The Zohar: Pritzker Edition. Translation and commentary by Nathan Wolski, volume 10, pages 366–401. Stanford, California: Stanford University Press, 2016.
Zohar part 1, pages 21a, 50a, 100b, 103a, 121a–34a, 135b, 141a, 142a, 181b, 187a, 223a, 224a; part 2, pages 39b, 236a; part 3, pages 103a, 148b, 158a; Raya Mehemna 60a. Spain, late 13th Century. In, e.g., The Zohar. Translated by Harry Sperling and Maurice Simon. 5 volumes. London: Soncino Press, 1934.
Bahya ben Asher. Commentary on the Torah. Spain, early 14th century. In, e.g., Midrash Rabbeinu Bachya: Torah Commentary by Rabbi Bachya ben Asher. Translated and annotated by Eliyahu Munk, volume 1, pages 346–84. Jerusalem: Lambda Publishers, 2003.
Isaac ben Moses Arama. Akedat Yizhak (The Binding of Isaac). Late 15th century. In, e.g., Yitzchak Arama. Akeydat Yitzchak: Commentary of Rabbi Yitzchak Arama on the Torah. Translated and condensed by Eliyahu Munk, volume 1, pages 159–76. New York, Lambda Publishers, 2001.

Modern
Isaac Abravanel. Commentary on the Torah. Italy, between 1492–1509. In, e.g., Abarbanel: Selected Commentaries on the Torah: Volume 1: Bereishis/Genesis. Translated and annotated by Israel Lazar, pages 129–46. Brooklyn: CreateSpace, 2015.
Obadiah ben Jacob Sforno. Commentary on the Torah. Venice, 1567. In, e.g., Sforno: Commentary on the Torah. Translation and explanatory notes by Raphael Pelcovitz, pages 114–29. Brooklyn: Mesorah Publications, 1997.
Moshe Alshich. Commentary on the Torah. Safed, circa 1593. In, e.g., Moshe Alshich. Midrash of Rabbi Moshe Alshich on the Torah. Translated and annotated by Eliyahu Munk, volume 1, pages 145–63. New York, Lambda Publishers, 2000.

Avraham Yehoshua Heschel. Commentaries on the Torah. Cracow, Poland, mid 17th century. Compiled as Chanukat HaTorah. Edited by Chanoch Henoch Erzohn. Piotrkow, Poland, 1900. In Avraham Yehoshua Heschel. Chanukas HaTorah: Mystical Insights of Rav Avraham Yehoshua Heschel on Chumash. Translated by Avraham Peretz Friedman, pages 65–69. Southfield, Michigan: Targum Press/Feldheim Publishers, 2004.
Chaim ibn Attar. Ohr ha-Chaim. Venice, 1742. In Chayim ben Attar. Or Hachayim: Commentary on the Torah. Translated by Eliyahu Munk, volume 1, pages 185–200. Brooklyn: Lambda Publishers, 1999.

Emily Dickinson. Poem 506 (He touched me, so I live to know). 1862. In The Complete Poems of Emily Dickinson. Edited by Thomas H. Johnson, page 246. New York: Little, Brown & Co., 1960.
Samuel David Luzzatto (Shadal). Commentary on the Torah. Padua, 1871. In, e.g., Samuel David Luzzatto. Torah Commentary. Translated and annotated by Eliyahu Munk, volume 1, pages 217–40. New York: Lambda Publishers, 2012.

Yehudah Aryeh Leib Alter. Sefat Emet. Góra Kalwaria (Ger), Poland, before 1906. Excerpted in The Language of Truth: The Torah Commentary of Sefat Emet. Translated and interpreted by Arthur Green, pages 33–36. Philadelphia: Jewish Publication Society, 1998. Reprinted 2012.
Hermann Cohen. Religion of Reason: Out of the Sources of Judaism. Translated with an introduction by Simon Kaplan; introductory essays by Leo Strauss, page 301. New York: Ungar, 1972. Reprinted Atlanta: Scholars Press, 1995. Originally published as Religion der Vernunft aus den Quellen des Judentums. Leipzig: Gustav Fock, 1919.

Alexander Alan Steinbach. Sabbath Queen: Fifty-four Bible Talks to the Young Based on Each Portion of the Pentateuch, pages 14–17. New York: Behrman's Jewish Book House, 1936.
Thomas Mann. Joseph and His Brothers. Translated by John E. Woods, pages 11, 58, 93–94, 100, 127–28, 130, 133–34, 173, 185, 187, 203, 339–43, 353–54, 394–95, 476–77, 492–93, 496–98, 623, 779, 806. New York: Alfred A. Knopf, 2005. Originally published as Joseph und seine Brüder. Stockholm: Bermann-Fischer Verlag, 1943.
Manfred R. Lehmann. "Abraham's Purchase of Machpelah and Hittite Law." Bulletin of the American Schools of Oriental Research, volume 129 (1953): pages 15–18.

Robert A. Kraft. “A Note on the Oracle of Rebecca (Gen. XXV. 23).” The Journal of Theological Studies, volume 13 (number 2) (1962): pages 318–20.
Walter Orenstein and Hertz Frankel. Torah and Tradition: A Bible Textbook for Jewish Youth: Volume I: Bereishis, pages 52–60. New York: Hebrew Publishing Company, 1964.
Delmore Schwartz. "Sarah." In Selected Poems: Summer Knowledge. New Directions, 1967.

Martin Buber. On the Bible: Eighteen studies, pages 22–43. New York: Schocken Books, 1968.
R. David Freedman. “A New Approach to the Nuzi Sistership Contract.” Journal of the Ancient Near Eastern Society, volume 2 (number 2) (1970): pages 77–85.
Wolfgang M.W. Roth. "The Wooing of Rebekah. A Tradition-Critical Study of Genesis 24." Catholic Biblical Quarterly, volume 34 (1972): pages 177–87.
R. David Freedman. "‘Put Your Hand Under My Thigh'—The Patriarchal Oath." Biblical Archaeology Review, volume 2 (number 2) (June 1976).
Seän M. Warner. “The Patriarchs and Extra-Biblical Sources.” Journal for the Study of the Old Testament, volume 1, number 2 (June 1976): pages 50–61.
J. Maxwell Miller. “The Patriarchs and Extra-Biblical Sources: a Response.” Journal for the Study of the Old Testament, volume 1, number 2 (June 1976): pages 62–66.
Christine Garside Allen. "Who was Rebekah?" In Beyond Androcentrism: New Essays on Women and Religion. Edited by Rita M. Gross, pages 183–216. Missoula, Montana: Scholars, 1977.
John Tracy Luke. “Abraham and the Iron Age: Reflections on the New Patriarchal Studies.” Journal for the Study of the Old Testament, volume 2, number 4 (February 1977): pages 35–47.
Nehama Leibowitz. Studies in Bereshit (Genesis), pages 207–56. Jerusalem: The World Zionist Organization, 1981. Reprinted as New Studies in the Weekly Parasha. Lambda Publishers, 2010.
Walter Brueggemann. Genesis: Interpretation: A Bible Commentary for Teaching and Preaching, pages 194–203. Atlanta: John Knox Press, 1982.
Nahum M. Sarna. "Genesis Chapter 23: The Cave of Machpelah." Hebrew Studies, volume 23 (1982): pages 17–21.
K.T. Aitken. "The Wooing of Rebekah: A Study in the Development of a Tradition." Journal for the Study of the Old Testament, volume 30 (1984): pages 3–23.
Pinchas H. Peli. Torah Today: A Renewed Encounter with Scripture, pages 21–24. Washington, D.C.: B'nai B'rith Books, 1987.
Marc Gellman. "Rebekah and the Camel Who Made No Noise." In Does God Have a Big Toe? Stories About Stories in the Bible, pages 53–56. New York: HarperCollins, 1989.
Nahum M. Sarna. The JPS Torah Commentary: Genesis: The Traditional Hebrew Text with the New JPS Translation, pages 157–77, 395–97. Philadelphia: Jewish Publication Society, 1989.
Raymond Westbrook. Property and Family in Biblical Law, pages 24–35. Sheffield: Sheffield Academic Press, 1991.
Elizabeth Bloch-Smith. "Burials." In The Anchor Bible Dictionary. Edited by David Noel Freedman, volume 1, pages 785–94. New York: Doubleday, 1992.
Aaron Wildavsky. Assimilation versus Separation: Joseph the Administrator and the Politics of Religion in Biblical Israel, pages 6–7. New Brunswick, N.J.: Transaction Publishers, 1993.
Judith S. Antonelli. "Milkah: Sarah's Sister." In In the Image of God: A Feminist Commentary on the Torah, pages 48–59. Northvale, New Jersey: Jason Aronson, 1995.
Naomi H. Rosenblatt and Joshua Horwitz. Wrestling With Angels: What Genesis Teaches Us About Our Spiritual Identity, Sexuality, and Personal Relationships, pages 204–27. Delacorte Press, 1995.
Avivah Gottlieb Zornberg. The Beginning of Desire: Reflections on Genesis, pages 123–43. New York: Image Books/Doubelday, 1995.

Ellen Frankel. The Five Books of Miriam: A Woman’s Commentary on the Torah, pages 31–38. New York: G. P. Putnam's Sons, 1996.
W. Gunther Plaut. The Haftarah Commentary, pages 44–53. New York: UAHC Press, 1996.
Sorel Goldberg Loeb and Barbara Binder Kadden. Teaching Torah: A Treasury of Insights and Activities, pages 33–38. Denver: A.R.E. Publishing, 1997.
Susan Freeman. Teaching Jewish Virtues: Sacred Sources and Arts Activities, pages 102–18, 165–78. Springfield, New Jersey: A.R.E. Publishing, 1999. (53).
John S. Kselman. "Genesis." In The HarperCollins Bible Commentary. Edited by James L. Mays, page 97. New York: HarperCollins Publishers, revised edition, 2000.
Rona Shapiro. "Woman's Life, Woman's Truth." In The Women's Torah Commentary: New Insights from Women Rabbis on the 54 Weekly Torah Portions. Edited by Elyse Goldstein, pages 70–74. Woodstock, Vermont: Jewish Lights Publishing, 2000.

Israel Finkelstein and Neil Asher Silberman. “Searching for the Patriarchs.” In The Bible Unearthed: Archaeology's New Vision of Ancient Israel and the Origin of Its Sacred Texts, pages 27–47. New York: The Free Press, 2001.
Lainie Blum Cogan and Judy Weiss. Teaching Haftarah: Background, Insights, and Strategies, pages 102–09. Denver: A.R.E. Publishing, 2002.
Michael Fishbane. The JPS Bible Commentary: Haftarot, pages 29–34. Philadelphia: Jewish Publication Society, 2002.
Tikva Frymer-Kensky. “The Hand that Rocks the Cradle: The Rivka Stories.” In Reading the Women of the Bible, pages 5–23. New York: Schocken Books, 2002.

Admiel Kosman. “The Story of a Giant Story: The Winding Way of Og King of Bashan in the Jewish Haggadic Tradition.” Hebrew Union College Annual, volume 73 (2002): pages 157–90.
Robert Alter. The Five Books of Moses: A Translation with Commentary, pages 113–29. New York: W.W. Norton & Co., 2004.
Jon D. Levenson. "Genesis." In The Jewish Study Bible. Edited by Adele Berlin and Marc Zvi Brettler, pages 47–53. New York: Oxford University Press, 2004.
Lieve M. Teugels. Bible and Midrash: The Story of "The Wooing of Rebekah" (Genesis 24). Leuven: Peeters Publishers, 2004.
Professors on the Parashah: Studies on the Weekly Torah Reading Edited by Leib Moscovitz, pages 47–53. Jerusalem: Urim Publications, 2005.
W. Gunther Plaut. The Torah: A Modern Commentary: Revised Edition. Revised edition edited by David E.S. Stern, pages 153–71. New York: Union for Reform Judaism, 2006.
Suzanne A. Brody. "Rebecca's Goodbye." In Dancing in the White Spaces: The Yearly Torah Cycle and More Poems, page 66. Shelbyville, Kentucky: Wasteland Press, 2007.
Terence E. Fretheim. Abraham: Trials of Family and Faith. Columbia, South Carolina: University of South Carolina Press, 2007.

James L. Kugel. How To Read the Bible: A Guide to Scripture, Then and Now, pages 97, 121, 133–55, 166, 400. New York: Free Press, 2007.
The Torah: A Women's Commentary. Edited by Tamara Cohn Eskenazi and Andrea L. Weiss, pages 111–32. New York: URJ Press, 2008.
Rachel Brodie. “When Gender Varies: A Curious Case of Kere and Ketiv: Parashat Chayei Sarah (Genesis 23:1–25:18).” In Torah Queeries: Weekly Commentaries on the Hebrew Bible. Edited by Gregg Drinkwater, Joshua Lesser, and David Shneer; foreword by Judith Plaskow, pages 34–37. New York: New York University Press, 2009.
Reuven Hammer. Entering Torah: Prefaces to the Weekly Torah Portion, pages 29–34. New York: Gefen Publishing House, 2009.

Jonathan Sacks. Covenant & Conversation: A Weekly Reading of the Jewish Bible: Genesis: The Book of Beginnings, pages 121–44. New Milford, Connecticut: Maggid Books, 2009.
John H. Walton. "Genesis." In Zondervan Illustrated Bible Backgrounds Commentary. Edited by John H. Walton, volume 1, pages 99–104. Grand Rapids, Michigan: Zondervan, 2009.
Henrietta L. Wiley. “They Save Themselves Alone: Faith and Loss in the Stories of Abraham and Job.” Journal for the Study of the Old Testament, volume 34 (number 2) (December 2009): pages 115–29.
Karolien Vermeulen. “The 'Song' of the Servant—Gen 24:23.” Vetus Testamentum, volume 61 (number 3) (2011): pages 499–504.
Calum Carmichael. The Book of Numbers: A Critique of Genesis, pages 7, 19–20, 22, 37, 91–92, 99, 105–06, 109–10, 112–13, 115, 117–18, 120–22, 124, 141, 156, 162, 191. New Haven: Yale University Press, 2012.
William G. Dever. The Lives of Ordinary People in Ancient Israel: When Archaeology and the Bible Intersect, page 137. Grand Rapids, Michigan: William B. Eerdmans Publishing Company, 2012.

Shmuel Herzfeld. "The Prohibition of Intermarriage." In Fifty-Four Pick Up: Fifteen-Minute Inspirational Torah Lessons, pages 24–28. Jerusalem: Gefen Publishing House, 2012.
Jonathan Sacks. Lessons in Leadership: A Weekly Reading of the Jewish Bible, pages 23–26. New Milford, Connecticut: Maggid Books, 2015.
“The Hittites: Between Tradition and History.” Biblical Archaeology Review, volume 42 (number 2) (March/April 2016): pages 28–40, 68.
Jean-Pierre Isbouts. Archaeology of the Bible: The Greatest Discoveries From Genesis to the Roman Era, page 58. Washington, D.C.: National Geographic, 2016.
Jonathan Sacks. Essays on Ethics: A Weekly Reading of the Jewish Bible, pages 27–31. New Milford, Connecticut: Maggid Books, 2016.
Shai Held. The Heart of Torah, Volume 1: Essays on the Weekly Torah Portion: Genesis and Exodus, pages 40–48. Philadelphia: Jewish Publication Society, 2017.
Ekaterina E. Kozlova. “Abraham's Burial (Genesis 25.9): An Idyllic Burial or a Dispute over Inheritance?” Journal for the Study of the Old Testament, volume 42, number 2 (December 2017): pages 139–53.

Steven Levy and Sarah Levy. The JPS Rashi Discussion Torah Commentary, pages 15–17. Philadelphia: Jewish Publication Society, 2017.
Pekka Pitkänen. “Ancient Israelite Population Economy: Ger, Toshav, Nakhri and Karat as Settler Colonial Categories.” Journal for the Study of the Old Testament, volume 42, number 2 (December 2017): pages 139–53.
Jeffrey K. Salkin. The JPS B'nai Mitzvah Torah Commentary, pages 21–25. Philadelphia: Jewish Publication Society, 2017.
Liana Finck. Let There Be Light: The Real Story of Her Creation, pages 209–35. New York: Random House, 2022.

External links

Texts
Masoretic text and 1917 JPS translation
Hear the parashah chanted
Hear the parashah read in Hebrew

Commentaries

Academy for Jewish Religion, California
Academy for Jewish Religion, New York
Akhlah: The Jewish Children's Learning Network
Aish.com 
Akhlah: The Jewish Children's Learning Network
Aleph Beta Academy
Alicia Jo Rabins
American Jewish University —Ziegler School of Rabbinic Studies
Ari Goldwag
Ascent of Safed
Bar-Ilan University
Chabad.org
eparsha.com
G-dcast
The Israel Koschitzky Virtual Beit Midrash
Jewish Agency for Israel
Jewish Theological Seminary
Mechon Hadar
Miriam Aflalo
MyJewishLearning.com
Ohr Sameach
Orthodox Union
OzTorah, Torah from Australia
Oz Ve Shalom—Netivot Shalom
Pardes from Jerusalem
Professor James L. Kugel
Rabbi Dov Linzer
Rabbi Fabian Werbin
Rabbi Jonathan Sacks
RabbiShimon.com 
Rabbi Shlomo Riskin
Rabbi Shmuel Herzfeld
Rabbi Stan Levin
Reconstructionist Judaism 
Sephardic Institute
Shiur.com
613.org Jewish Torah Audio
Tanach Study Center
Teach613.org, Torah Education at Cherry Hill
TheTorah.com
Torah from Dixie 
Torah.org
TorahVort.com
Union for Reform Judaism
United Synagogue of Conservative Judaism
What's Bothering Rashi?
Yeshivat Chovevei Torah
Yeshiva University

Weekly Torah readings in Cheshvan
Weekly Torah readings from Genesis
Abraham